Sudhiranjan Lahiri Mahavidyalaya (popularly known as Majdia College) established in 1966, is a college at Majhdia in Nadia district, West Bengal, India. It offers undergraduate courses in arts and commerce. It is affiliated to  University of Kalyani.
The 2015 Raj Chakraborty-directed movie Parbo Naa Aami Chartey Toke was shot in this college.

Departments

Arts and Commerce

Bengali
English
History
Geography
Political Science
Philosophy
Sociology
Economics
Defence Studies
Physical Education
Commerce

Accreditation
The college is recognized by the University Grants Commission (UGC). It is a B+ grade college.

See also

References

External links
Sudhiranjan Lahiri Mahavidyalaya 
University of Kalyani
University Grants Commission
National Assessment and Accreditation Council

Colleges affiliated to University of Kalyani
Educational institutions established in 1966
Universities and colleges in Nadia district
1966 establishments in West Bengal